Archi  is a Northeast Caucasian language spoken by the Archis in the village of Archib, southern Dagestan, Russia, and the six surrounding smaller villages.

It is unusual for its many phonemes and for its contrast between several voiceless velar lateral fricatives, voiceless and ejective velar lateral affricates, and a voiced velar lateral fricative, . It is an ergative–absolutive language with four noun classes and has a remarkable morphological system with irregularities on all levels. Mathematically, there are 1,502,839 possible forms that can be derived from a single verb root.

Classification
The classification of the Archi language has not been definitively established. Peter von Uslar felt it should be considered a variant of Avar, but Roderich von Erckert saw it as closer to Lak. The language has also been considered as a separate entity that could be placed somewhere between Avar and Lak. The Italian linguist Alfredo Trombetti placed Archi within an Avar–Ando–Dido group, but today the most widely recognized opinion follows that of the Soviet scholar Bokarev, who regards Archi as one of the Lezgian–Samur group of the Dagestan languages. Schulze places it in the Lezgian branch with all other Lezgian languages belonging to the Samur group.

Phonology
Archi has, like its Northeast Caucasian relatives, a very complicated phonological system, with Archi being an extreme example. It has 26 vowel phonemes and, depending on analysis, between 74 and 82 consonant phonemes.

Vowels
Archi has a symmetric six-vowel system. All except  can occur in five varieties: short, pharyngealized, high tone, long (with high tone), and pharyngealized with high tone (e.g. Of all these, only  and  do not occur word-initially.

Consonants
Of all known languages, Archi has the world's largest phonemic non-click consonant inventory, with only the recently extinct Ubykh of the Northwest Caucasian languages having a few more. The table below shows all consonants that can be found in the Archi Language Tutorial and the Archi Dictionary.

Some of these sounds are very rare.

"Strong phonemes are characterized by the intensiveness (tension) of the articulation. The intensity of the pronunciation leads to a natural lengthening of the duration of the sound, and that is why strong [consonants] differ from weak ones by greater length. [However,] the adjoining of two single weak sounds does not produce a strong one […] Thus, the gemination of a sound does not by itself create its tension."

The voiceless velar lateral fricative , the voiced velar lateral fricative , and the corresponding voiceless and ejective affricates ,  are extremely unusual speech sounds among the languages of the world, because velar fricatives are usually central rather than lateral. The velar laterals are further forward than velars in most languages and could better be called prevelar, like the Tutorial does.

Orthography
Until recently Archi did not have a written form, except in studies by specialists who used the Latin script. In 2006, the Surrey Morphology Group developed a Cyrillic alphabet for Archi based on the Avar alphabet, which is used in the Archi–Russian–English Dictionary alongside an IPA transcription.

Grammar

Nouns
Archi nouns inflect for number (singular or plural) and for one of 10 regular cases and 5 locative cases that can all take one of 6 directional suffixes. There are four noun classes, which are only evident from verbal agreement.

Case

Depending on the specifics of the analysis, the ergative and the absolutive cases are not always marked by a specific suffix. Rather, they are marked by the use of the basic (for the absolutive) and oblique (for the ergative) stems in the absence of other markers. There is also a locative-case series in which 6 directional-case suffixes are combined with 5 spatial cases to produce a total of 30 case-localization combinations. However, they do not constitute 30 distinct case forms because they are easily derivable from a pair of morphemes.

Noun classes
The four noun classes of Archi are only evident from verbal inflection. This table summarizes the noun classes and their associated verbal morphology:

Example phrases
The following phrases were phonetically transcribed from Archi:

Diminutive
The inclusions of "little" and "young" in the phrases translate a diminutive, which in Archi language commonly refers either to a smaller or younger version of the subject.  The non-diminutive nouns in the above examples belong to noun class III, while their diminutives belong to noun class IV.  This difference in noun class is reflected on the verb in all of these examples, by the contrast between class III agreement in b from class IV in ∅ (with no b). The -b- in the past tense appears in front of the -x̄u / -č̣u / -ku inflection, while in the present tense the b- is the first letter of the verb.  For the nouns referring to inanimate objects, the class shift is the only sign of the diminutive: the noun itself does not change in form.  E.g. x́it means both "ladle" (III) and "spoon" (IV), k̂ut̄ali both "bag" (III) and "little bag" (IV). Nouns pertaining to younger animals have different words, e.g. dogi "donkey" (III) but ḳêrt "young donkey" (IV), nôiš "horse" (III) but uri "young horse" (IV).

References

Bibliography

 

Bond, Oliver, Greville G. Corbett, Marina Chumakina & Dunstan Brown (eds.). 2016. Archi: Complexities of agreement in cross-theoretical perspective. Oxford: Oxford University Press.

Further reading

External links
Appendix:Cyrillic script
Archi–Russian–English dictionary
Archi language tutorial
Archi Vocabulary List (from the World Loanword Database)
Archi basic lexicon at the Global Lexicostatistical Database
A sample of the Archi language, 'the Bear Story':
as a sound file
in written form
https://www.smg.surrey.ac.uk/languages/archi/ Archi language overview

Northeast Caucasian languages
Languages of Russia
Endangered Caucasian languages
Languages written in Cyrillic script